The 2001 Chatham Cup was the 74th annual nationwide knockout football competition in New Zealand.

Up to the last 16 of the competition, the cup was run in three regions (northern, central, and southern), with central and southern regions combining at the fourth round and an open draw from the quarter-finals on. National League teams received a bye until the Fourth Round. In all, 136 teams took part in the competition. Note: Different sources give different numberings for the rounds of the competition. Some record five rounds prior to the quarter-finals; others note a preliminary round followed by four full rounds. The former system is used in this article.

Tied matches were decided by golden goal extra time and penalty shoot-outs.

The 2001 final
University-Mount Wellington and Central United played out a six-goal draw before the match went to penalties. This came down to the tenth kick, with University-Mount Wellington winning 5–4.

The Jack Batty Memorial Cup is awarded to the player adjudged to have made to most positive impact in the Chatham Cup final. The winner of the 2001 Jack Batty Memorial Cup was Paul Bunbury of University-Mount Wellington.

Results

Third round

* Won on penalties by Western (4–2), Melville United (4–3), Taupo (4–3), and Petone (5–4)

Fourth round

Fifth round

Quarter-finals

Semi-finals

Final

University-Mount Wellington won 5–4 on penalties:
Bunbury (U-MtW) scored – 1–0
Major (Central) scored – 1–1
McCormack (U-MtW) scored – 2–1
Carmody (Central) scored – 2–2
Pearce (U-MtW) scored – 3–2
Aliaga (Central) scored – 3–3
Roberts (U-MtW) scored – 4–3
Banks (Central) scored – 4–4
Waetford (U-MtW) scored – 5–4 (kick was retaken after goalkeeper moved)
Greenhalgh (Central) missed – 5–4

References

Rec.Sport.Soccer Statistics Foundation New Zealand 2001 page
UltimateNZSoccer website 2001 Chatham Cup page

Chatham Cup
Chatham Cup
Chatham Cup
Chat